The 1998 National Camogie League is a competition in the women's team field sport of camogie was won by Cork, who defeated Galway in the final, played at Ballinasloe. It was the last National League to be played with 12-a-side.

Arrangements
Galway beat Kilkenny 3-10 to 1-13 in the semi-final on May 24. They fell behind 1-1 to nil before two goals from Sharon Glynn and a third by Ann Forde after Glynn's pass Helped them to a first-ever victory over Kilkenny in camogie at Nowlan Park.

The Final
Cork's victory in the final was largely due to the accuracy of veteran Lynn Dunlea who scored 12-12 in what was an outstanding individual performance. Galway took the lead with ten minutes to go for the first time from a Sharon Glynn pointed thirty, but it did not last long as Cork's Fiona O'Driscoll equalised before Lynn Dunlea scored a well worked goal after a pass from substitute Caoimhe Harrington. Galway lost midfielder Carmel Hannon during the first half when she injured her leg in a fall. Sharon Glynn and Vivienne Harris became the first camogie players to be sent off in a National League final when they were red carded following a tussle.

Division 2
The Junior National League, known since 2006 as Division Two, was won by Down who defeated Cork intermediates in the final at Ballincollig on June 1. Down beat Tipperary 4-12 to 1-10 and Cork beat Galway 3-10 to 1-9 in the semi-finals.

Final stages

References

External links
 Camogie Association

National Camogie League
1998